These are the official results of the Men's javelin throw event at the 1994 European Championships in Helsinki, Finland, held at Helsinki Olympic Stadium on 7 and 8 August 1994. There were a total number of 26 participating athletes.  The defending European Champion Steve Backley retained his title and set a championship record (85.20 metres) in the final round, using an enhanced javelin model.

Medalists

Schedule
All times are Eastern European Time (UTC+2)

Abbreviations
All results shown are in metres

Records

Qualification

Group A

Group B

Final

Participation
According to an unofficial count, 26 athletes from 15 countries participated in the event.

 (1)
 (1)
 (2)
 (2)
 (3)
 (3)
 (1)
 (1)
 (1)
 (1)
 (1)
 (1)
 (3)
 (2)
 (3)

See also
 1991 Men's World Championships Javelin Throw (Tokyo)
 1992 Men's Olympic Javelin Throw (Barcelona)
 1993 Men's World Championships Javelin Throw (Stuttgart)
 1995 Men's World Championships Javelin Throw (Gothenburg)
 1996 Men's Olympic Javelin Throw (Atlanta)
 1997 Men's World Championships Javelin Throw (Athens)

References

 Results
 trackfield.brinkster

Javelin throw
Javelin throw at the European Athletics Championships